The Los Angeles Daily News is the second-largest-circulating paid daily newspaper of Los Angeles, California. It is the flagship of the Southern California News Group, a branch of Colorado-based Digital First Media.

The offices of the Daily News are in Chatsworth, and much of the paper's reporting is targeted toward readers in the San Fernando Valley in Los Angeles. Its stories tend to focus on issues involving local San Fernando Valley businesses, education, and crime.

The editor currently is Frank Pine.

History

Earlier titles
The Daily News began publication in Van Nuys as the Van Nuys Call in 1911, morphing into the Van Nuys News after a merger with a competing newspaper called the News. 

In 1953, the newspaper was renamed the Van Nuys News and Valley Green Sheet. The front page was produced on green newsprint. During this period, the newspaper was delivered four times a week for free to readers in 14 zoned editions in the San Fernando Valley.

In 1971, the newspaper was sold to the Tribune Company by the original family owners. 

In 1976, to de-emphasize the Van Nuys location, the paper changed its name to the Valley News and Green Sheet, and gradually converted from the four times a week operation to a daily newspaper with paid circulation. During this period, circulation increased to 210,000.

Los Angeles Daily News
In 1981, the paper changed its name to the Daily News of Los Angeles and became a daily publication. In 1985, Tribune bought KTLA, and due to ownership laws of the time, Tribune sold the paper to Jack Kent Cooke, who spent millions of dollars building state of the art offices and expanding coverage to include the entire San Fernando Valley.

When the Los Angeles Herald Examiner went out of business November 2, 1989, it left the Daily News the second-biggest paper in the city behind the Los Angeles Times. Upon Cooke's death in 1997, William Dean Singleton's MediaNews purchased the newspaper and consolidated it with his other Southern California MediaNews holdings into the Los Angeles Newspaper Group.

The group briefly published local editions for the Antelope Valley, Santa Clarita and Ventura County. However, to cut costs and consolidate resources, the local editions were eliminated. 

As part of circulation reporting for the Southern California News Group, all papers in LANG are considered editions of the Daily News.

The Daily News endorsed Barack Obama for president in 2008, but then endorsed his opponent Mitt Romney in 2012.

Similarly titled earlier newspapers
The Daily News bears no relation to an earlier historic Los Angeles Daily News (1923–1954), a morning newspaper based in Downtown Los Angeles (originally the Illustrated Daily News) that ceased publication on December 18, 1954.

An even earlier newspaper called the Los Angeles Daily News was printed beginning in 1869 and continuing for a number of years after.

See also

References

External links

Daily News Mobile app — headlines only.
 Los Angeles Public Library Photo Collection: Valley Times Newspaper Collection (1946−1965) — 82,000 images, 28,000 digitalized/online.

Daily newspapers published in Greater Los Angeles
San Fernando Valley
Digital First Media
Companies based in Los Angeles
Woodland Hills, Los Angeles
Newspapers established in 1911
1911 establishments in California
MediaNews Group publications